Abu Ali is a retired Nigerian Army brigadier general, he was Governor of Bauchi State, Nigeria from August 1990 to July 1992 during the military regime of Major General Ibrahim Babangida and is now the current Etsu of Bassa Nge in Kogi State, He is a complete Bassa Nge by tribe from Kpata. North Central Nigeria. He is a first class title holder who is widely respected.

As governor of Bauchi State he commissioned the Bauchi Township Water project, formed the Wikki Tourists Football Team, consolidated the Tomato Processing Company project and completed some hospital projects.

In 1991 there were riots in Tafawa Balewa, where Christians and Muslims disputed a shared abattoir. The trouble spread to Bauchi and other towns. After some delay, Abu Ali imposed a dusk to dawn curfew, banned all public gatherings and deployed police and soldiers in all troubled areas to keep the peace. In all, perhaps 1,000 people died.

Abu Ali was a down to earth military man who gave his full concentration to his work.

He handed over to a democratically elected government in January 1992.

He retired from the Nigerian Army in 1999 at the rank of a Brigadier General.

He is also the father of Late Lt. Colonel Muhammad Abu Ali who was killed by Boko Haram troops at Mallam Fatori, Borno State, North Eastern Nigeria.

References

Living people
Governors of Bauchi State
Year of birth missing (living people)